"Duncan and Brady", also known as "Been on the Job Too Long", "Twinkle, Twinkle, Little Star", or simply "Brady", is a traditional murder ballad about the shooting of a policeman, Brady, by a bartender, Duncan. The song's lyrics stemmed from actual events, involving the shooting of James Brady in the Charles Starkes Saloon in St. Louis, Missouri. Harry Duncan was convicted of the murder, and later executed. Originally recorded by Wilmer Watts & his Lonely Eagles in 1929, it has been recorded numerous times, most famously by Lead Belly, also by Judy Henske, Dave Van Ronk, The Johnson Mountain Boys, New Riders of the Purple Sage, David Nelson Band, and Bob Dylan.

Origins 
Lyrics to the song, including the main characters Duncan and Brady, originated from a barroom shooting in St. Louis, Missouri. On October 6, 1890, several police officers, including James Brady, arrived at the Charles Starkes Saloon in downtown St. Louis, where a bar fight was taking place. The officers tried to arrest patrons of the bar suspected of starting the fight, which prompted a gunfight. Brady was shot by an unknown man, supposedly by the bar's owner, Charles Starkes. Harry Duncan claimed such when he was arrested for Brady's murder; Starkes denied the claim. Duncan was convicted and was sentenced to hang, but through several appeals, the case made its way to the Supreme Court. However, this appeal was denied, and Duncan was hanged on July 27, 1894. It was rumored that Charles Starkes later confessed to the murder on his deathbed.

However, a Mrs. Tom Barrett (or Barret), a resident of Marlin, Texas, wrote to folklorist Dorothy Scarborough about the song's lyrics and origins. She identified Waco as the scene of the shooting, although she did not specify whether or not it occurred in a bar. The song may bear a close relation to the tune of the traditional Negro ballad "Bad Man Ballad".

Lyrics
"Duncan and Brady" is a typical "bad man" murder ballad, such as "Frankie and Johnny" or "Stagger Lee". The song begins with Brady, a policeman, riding around in an electric car, with a "mean look in his eye", looking to "shoot somebody just to see him die". He walks into a bar, which Duncan is tending, and arrests him. Duncan then shoots Brady, and Brady then dies. However, in the next verse, Brady is told that he "knew he done wrong", because he was,

Walkin' in the room when the game was goin' on
Knockin down windows, breakin' down the door

Women hear of the death of Brady and all dress in red. In a second variation recorded by Lead Belly, there is also mention of Brady's wife, who expects to get a pension from his death.

It's interesting to note that even though the detailed news article and lyrics from Leadbelly and others identify Brady as the policeman and Duncan as the civilian, Wilmer Watts who first recorded the song places the star on Duncan's chest:

Brady was a worker on the telephone wire
Long come Duncan with a shining star

Wilmer Watts was born and lived in North Carolina  and only recorded for Paramount in Chicago in 1929. The Duncan and Brady incident happened in 1890.  Therefore, it is likely Watts heard the story or the song after it had passed through many singers.

Recordings

Footnotes

External links 
 Lyrics of Bob Dylan's and Lead Belly's versions

Bob Dylan songs
Lead Belly songs
Traditional ballads
Murder ballads